Christianity is a minority religion in Maharashtra, a state of India. Approximately 79.8% of the population of Maharashtra are Hindus, with Christian adherents being 1.0% of the population. The Roman Catholic archdiocese whose seat is in Maharashtra is the Roman Catholic Archdiocese of Bombay. There are two different Christian ethnic communities in Maharashtra: the East Indians, who are predominantly Roman Catholic, and the Marathi Christians, who are predominantly Protestant with a small Roman Catholic population. The Catholics in Maharashtra are mainly concentrated in coastal Maharashtra, especially Vasai, Mumbai, and Raigad, and are known as East Indians; they were evangelized by Portuguese missionaries during the 15th–16th centuries. Protestants, who reside throughout the Maharashtra, being significant in Ahmednagar, Solapur, Pune Aurangabad, and Jalna, are called Marathi Christians, who were evangelized by British and American missionaries during British rule in India. The Church of North India has dioceses in the state and is a large Protestant church with full communion with the Anglican Church.

There are also some members of the Christian Revival Church in Maharashtra.

History

Christianity was brought to the North Konkan region of Maharashtra by Bartholomew, one of the twelve apostles of Christ. Pantaneus visited India in about AD 180, and there he found a Gospel of Matthew written in the Hebrew language, left with the Christians there by Barthlomew. This is mentioned by church historian Eusebius, and by Jerome in one of his letters. A flourishing Christian community in the 6th century was mentioned by Kosmos Indicopleustes and Jordanus, who worked among the Christians in Thana and Sopara areas in the 13th century. The French Dominican friar Jordanus Catalani of Severac (in south-western France) started evangelizing activities in Thana and Sopara and was the first work of Rome in North Konkan.

Most of the history of the church in India is lost between the 9th and 14th centuries, as Persia went over to Nestorianism in 800 AD. Since the provision of church offices and all the apparatus of public worship was looked to a foreign source, the Indian Christians were reduced to "nominal" Christians when this foreign aid was withdrawn. When Dominican and Franciscan missionaries arrived in the 1300s with the intention of preaching the Gospel, they were surprised to find a small Christian community already in existence. Protestant missionaries first arrived in Maharashtra from England and the United States in 1813 after the passing of the Charter Act of 1813 by the British parliament.

East Indians (Mobaikars)

East Indians, also known as Mobaikars, are an ethno-religious group native to the Seven Islands of Bombay and Mumbai metropolitan area in the northern Konkan Division. Christianity was first installed by Bartholomew, one of Jesus Christ's apostles. Owing to a shortage of priests for many years, the locals were reduced to being "nominal Christians". It was because of the arrival of Portuguese and with them Jesuit missionaries who spread a new form of Christianity called Roman Catholicism in the area. The name Bombay East Indians was taken in the British India to differentiate native Christians of Greater Bombay, from those of Goa and Mangalore who came to Mumbai in search of jobs, on the occasion of golden jubilee of Queen Victoria.

They are engaged in agriculture, fishing and other occupations handed down to them by their ancestors. Bombay East Indians are generally more anglicised than other Maharashtrian Christians. The influence of the Portuguese Bombay and Bassein era can be seen in their religion and names, but their language has dominated by Marathi since the Mahratta Confederacy seized control of Konkan in 1739 AD.

Bardeskars 

Konkani Catholics, commonly called Bardeskar (natives of Bardes, Goa—their ancestral homeland), are an ethno-religious Christian community adhering to the Roman Rite from the Sindhudurg diocese (Sindhudurg and Ratnagiri districts) of the southern Konkan division of Maharashtra, India. Sporadic settlements of Ghata Voylem Kristanv (Konkani for "Christians from above the Ghauts") are found in the uplands of Kolhapur, Belgaum, North Canara & Dharwad districts. They belong to the Konkani ethnicity and Konkani is their first language. Marathi and Kannada are among the other languages spoken by them.

Marathi Christians

Marathi Christians are predominantly Protestant with small numbers of Roman Catholics. They belong to several Protestant denominations, but mainly the Church of North India. British missionary William Carey was instrumental in translating the Bible into the Marathi language.

In Maharashtra, Protestant Christians are mainly converts from Hinduism and some from Islam. The first Protestant mission to India was the American Marathi Mission. The main center of Protestant activity in the Maharashtra region during British colonial rule was in Ahmadnagar district. The first Protestant mission in the district was opened in 1831 by the American Marathi mission.

In Maharashtra, the Protestant missionaries concentrated not only on direct evangelism but also founded numerous small vernacular schools. Scottish Presbyterian Missionary John Wilson built Wilson College, Mumbai.

Culture
There are similarities of customs and culture between Hindus and Marathi Christians, such as dress, food, and cuisine. The Hindu custom of wearing saree, mangalsutra, and bindis is still prominent among native Christians. Marathi Christians highly retain their Marathi culture, and they have kept their Pre-Christian surnames. In Maharashtra, the great Marathi poet Narayan Wamanrao Tilak realised that a Hindu–Christian synthesis was simply not possible, unless the Christian religion had deep roots in the Indian culture. He trained the Marathi Christians to worship and sing bhajan and kirtan. He showed Christian faith in a genuinely Indian way.

List of denominations 

       
Assemblies of God
Catholic Church in India
St Thomas Christians 
Church of North India
Christian Congregation in India
The Pentecostal Mission                    
Greater Grace World Outreach- Indian Missions
Hindustani Covenant Church
Methodist Church in India
Indian Evangelical Team
International Christian Fellowship
Separate Baptists in Christ
New Life Fellowship Association
Christian Revival Church
Free Methodist Church

Notable Marathi Christians

Chandu Borde, a former cricket player from the Pune district. He played for the Indian cricket team in 83 matches between 1958 and 1969. His younger brother Ramesh was also a noteworthy cricket player.
Vijay Hazare, a cricket player from the Solapur district. He captained the Indian cricket team in fourteen matches between 1951 and 1953. He also captained Baroda, with whom he won the Ranji Trophy in 1959. Hazare is considered by many to be one of the best middle-order bats to play for India.
Shahu Modak, a Marathi/Hindi movie actor from Ahmednagar. He primarily acted as Lord Krishna in 29 mythological films.
Baba Padmanji, a Brahmin and a Christian convert. An author of over 100 books, his Yamunaparyatan is considered the first novel of Marathi literature.
Pandita Ramabai (1858–1922) – a social reformer, activist, Sanskrit scholar and evangelist. She was born a Brahmin and later converted to Christianity.
Lakshmibai Tilak (1868–1936) – wife of Narayan Wamanrao Tilak, was a writer who received recognition for her autobiography Smruti Chitre (स्मृतिचित्रे). When her husband died in the process of writing Khristayana (क्रिस्तायन), a Marathi epic about the life of Jesus, she completed it, adding 64 chapters of her own.
Narayan Wamanrao Tilak (1861–1919) – Marathi poet born in Maharashtra as a Brahmin. He converted to Christianity, and later wrote many Christian songs and bhajans in Marathi. He edited the American Marathi mission magazine Dnyanodaya for many years. He was the husband of Lakshmibai Tilak.
 Harish Salve, renowned jurist.
 N. K. P. Salve, former union minister and Congress leader from Vidarbha.
 Rajanikant Arole, Magasayse award winner and Padmabhushan.
 Vinod Kambli, a former cricket player for India and Mumbai, converted to Christianity recently. Many consider him one of the most talented middle-order batsmen to have played for India.
 Proff.Jayantkumar Tribhuvan, a President Awardee Teacher (1996). He was an educationist and also a notable writer, poet, dramatist, director, radio broadcaster, music director, and lyricist. He was the principal of a well-known school in Pune called Abhinav Vidyalaya High school. His songs are famous especially in the Christian community of Maharashtra. He wrote more than 35 books. He was a Sanskrit scholar. Sanskrit–Marathi–Hindi–English language teaching was his specialty along with his profound knowledge in dramatics. Many of his drama students are very successful actors in Bollywood as well as in Marathi films. He was the community advisor member of the national AIDS research council of India, where he had developed a model of teaching students about AIDS awareness which was accepted by UNO to teach student in their peer age group around the globe. He was also a very successful radio broadcaster who produced, wrote and directed more than 4000 radio programs for short wave radio stations. He dramatized the entire Bible in Marathi radio drama form. Those programs were on air (Radio Ceylon) during 1973–1990.

See also

 Marathi Christian
 Bombay East Indians
 Goans
Konkani people
 Cathedral of the Holy Name, Mumbai
Christian Revival Church

References

 
Religion in Maharashtra
Social groups of Maharashtra